Probable dolichyl pyrophosphate Glc1Man9GlcNAc2 alpha-1,3-glucosyltransferase is an enzyme that in humans is encoded by the ALG8 gene.

This gene encodes a member of the ALG6/ALG8 glucosyltransferase family. The encoded protein catalyzes the addition of the second glucose residue to the lipid-linked oligosaccharide precursor for N-linked glycosylation of proteins. Mutations in this gene have been associated with congenital disorder of glycosylation type Ih (CDG-Ih). Alternatively spliced transcript variants encoding different isoforms have been identified.

References

Further reading

External links
  GeneReviews/NCBI/NIH/UW entry on Congenital Disorders of Glycosylation Overview